Tutti gli uomini sono uguali is an Italian television series.

Cast
Enzo De Caro: Claudio
Massimo Wertmüller: Giacomo Sacchetti
Maurizio Crozza: Martino
Randi Ingerman: Alison
Francesco Salvi: psichiatra 
Alessandra Casella: Silvana
Mariangela D'Abbraccio: Penelope
Sabrina Salerno: Vittoria

See also
List of Italian television series

External links
 

Italian television series
1997 Italian television series debuts
1997 Italian television series endings
Italian comedy television series
Italia 1 original programming